Mary Therese "Teche" Sitoy-Cho is a Filipina politician from Cordova, Cebu, Philippines. She previously served as the mayor of Cordova. She is the daughter of former Presidential Adviser on Legislative Affairs Adelino Sitoy, who also previously served as the town's mayor.

References

External links
 

Living people
PDP–Laban politicians
Year of birth missing (living people)